Cyneoterpna alpina, the alpine grey, is a moth of the family Geometridae. The species was first described by Gilbert M. Goldfinch in 1929 It is found in the Australian state of New South Wales.

References

Moths described in 1929
Pseudoterpnini